Súper Óvalo Chiapas (Autódromo Chiapas) is a tri-oval track in Berriozábal, Chiapas near to Tuxtla Gutiérrez. The venue has a capacity for 17,000 people. Inner configuration has  of length and 12° of banking in the turns. On October 12, 2008, OSPE was inaugurated with a NASCAR Corona Series race.

The main event in this venue is the NMS. Also hosted local events (karting, touring cars, drag racing).

Layout

The track is run counter-clockwise. This layout is used by NASCAR Mexico Series, since 2008 to 2015.

The main road configuration has  of length. At the turn 2 exit, the layout enters to infield, and return in previous the turn 3. This layout is used for LATAM Challenge Series in 2010.

NASCAR Mexico Series

Súper Óvalo Chiapas (Autódromo Chiapas) has been venue for the Mexico Series since 2008, and was venue in 2010 for the first night race of this category.

Legal issues

Currently OSPE a local company alleged the propriety of the track, but in March 2010 Ocesa through Promotracks took the control of the Autodrómo, because a debt of 93 million pesos. However, since 2011 Promotracks website is down, and the track is near of the abandon.

References

External links
Autodromo de Chiapas race results at Racing-Reference

NASCAR tracks
Chiapas
Sports venues in Tuxtla Gutiérrez